March 2013

See also

References

 03
March 2013 events in the United States